Encinas Reales is a city located in the province of Córdoba, Spain. According to the 2006 census (INE), the city has a population of 2425 inhabitants.

Politics
In the 2007 municipal election, Spanish Socialist Workers' Party got 658 votes (40.69%, 5 seats in the municipal council), the Andalusian Party got 480 votes (29.68% and 3 seats), People's Party got 317 votes (19.60%, 2 seats ) and the United Left-Greens-Appeal for Andalucia got 149 votes (9.21%, 1 seat).

References

External links
Encinas Reales - Sistema de Información Multiterritorial de Andalucía

Municipalities in the Province of Córdoba (Spain)